Too-Rye-Ay is the second studio album by English pop band Dexys Midnight Runners. It was released in July 1982 by Mercury Records. The album is best known for the hit single "Come On Eileen", which included the refrain that inspired the album's title. It was the band's most successful album, debuting at number two on the UK Albums Chart.

Background
Shortly before recording this album, Dexys' bandleader Kevin Rowland had decided to add a violin section to the band's existing horn section, which had contributed strings (viola and cello) to the band's previous single, "Liars A to E".  However, after violinists Helen O'Hara and Steve Brennan joined the band, the three members of the horn section, including Dexys' co-leader and album co-composer "Big" Jim Paterson, decided to leave Dexys and become an independent horn band (ultimately known as The TKO Horns).  Rowland convinced them to stay with the band long enough to record the album and to perform in a kick-off concert debuting the album on BBC Radio One in June 1982.

All the songs on the album were rearranged to add strings, which caused Dexys to re-record the 1981 singles "Plan B", "Liars A to E", and "Soon".  During  the rearrangement process, "Soon" was revised into the opening section of "Plan B"; since both songs were written by Rowland and Paterson, the merged songs are credited on the album simply as "Plan B".

Release

The album's "Come On Eileen" became a number one hit in both the UK and the US. Dexys Midnight Runners are best known as a one-hit wonder in the US ("Come On Eileen" was also the first US single release by Dexys), but in the UK, "Geno" had previously reached number one, and "Jackie Wilson Said (I'm in Heaven When You Smile)" and "The Celtic Soul Brothers" were also UK hits.

Before "Come On Eileen", Dexys' only North American single was the Northern Soul classic "Seven Days Too Long", which Dexys' previous label EMI America had released only in Canada (with "Geno" as the B-side). However, on the strength of "Come On Eileen", Too-Rye-Ay reached number 14 in the US.  Dexys' success in US was not maintained; the best performer of the band's follow-up singles in the US was "The Celtic Soul Brothers", which peaked at number 86.

Different releases of Too-Rye-Ay featured different versions of "Come On Eileen". Certain editions of the album featured a version beginning with a solo fiddle playing the first line of the folk song "Believe Me, If All Those Endearing Young Charms" and ending with a simple fadeout (length: 4:12).  This version of the song is the one featured on the single release. However, many other versions of the album omit this fiddle solo, beginning directly with the bassline (length 4:07). Other editions of the album (including many of the "re-releases") featured a version without the violin intro and including a tag of Kevin Rowland singing "Young Charms" at the end (length: approximately 4:32), while the digital version offered by Spotify and the 2002 US CD reissue includes both front and end "Young Charms" tags. (length: approximately 4:47, or 4:19 without the ending tag). In addition, the most common release of the album features "Come On Eileen" as the final track, while the original US release features the tune as the opening track on Side 2.

The album was re-released in 1996 on CD with 8 bonus tracks. In 2000 an enhanced edition was released with the music videos for "Come On Eileen" and "Jackie Wilson Said" as bonus material. In 2002 a US edition with bonus tracks was released. Marking its 25th Anniversary, a 2007 2-CD Deluxe Edition was released, which included the entire 14-song album kickoff performance on BBC Radio 1 that had previously been released (without "I'll Show You") as BBC Radio One Live in Concert.

In August 2022 the album was again re-released with three CDs with the bonus tracks from 1996 plus five more and a live show from 1982. The studio album was also remixed; thus, it is called Too-Rye-Ay 'As It Should Have Sounded.' Rowland said about the remixes, "The songs and performances are great, but I always felt the mixes could be better. It's my most successful album, but it doesn't sound as good as the others." It was also released on vinyl.

Track listing

Release notes
There are several unlisted tracks on the album— "Old" includes a reprise of "Let's Make This Precious" at the end. The beginning of "Plan B" is actually the song "Soon", a version of which is the B-side to the "Show Me" single. "Come On Eileen" ends with an acapella rendition of an excerpt from "Believe Me, if All Those Endearing Young Charms", which is excised on the original US vinyl release.
Original US pressings have "Come On Eileen" at the beginning of side two. Also, "Plan B" and "I'll Show You" are presented as a single track.
The 2002 US CD reissue features the single version of "Come On Eileen" instead of the album version (which removes the fiddle intro).

Charts

Weekly charts

Year-end charts

Certifications and sales

Personnel

The players
 Seb Shelton – drums
 Giorgio Kilkenny – bass, backing vocals
 Kevin "Billy" Adams – banjo, guitar, backing vocals
 Mickey Billingham – organ, piano, accordion, keyboards, backing vocals
 "Big" Jim Paterson – trombone
 Paul Speare – flute, saxophone, tin whistle
 Brian Maurice – saxophone
 Kevin Rowland – bass, guitar, piano, director, vocals; digital remastering (reissue)
 Steve Wynne – bass (not credited on some releases)
"The Emerald Express"
 Helen O'Hara – violin
 Steve Brennan – violin

Guest musicians
"The Sisters of Scarlet"
 Carol Kenyon – vocals
 Katie Kissoon – vocals
 Sam Brown – vocals
Directed by
 Clive Langer – director
 Alan Winstanley – director
 Martin Rushent – engineering and direction (uncredited)
 Peter Barrett – cover design
 Kim Knott – photography
 Andrew Ratcliffe – artwork, paintings
 Tim Chacksfield – project coordinator (reissue)
 ID – Enhanced CD design (reissue)
 Philip Lloyd-Smee – CD package design (reissue)
 Richard Smith – liner notes (1996 reissue)

References

Dexys Midnight Runners albums
1982 albums
Albums produced by Alan Winstanley
Albums produced by Clive Langer
Mercury Records albums